The Kansas–Kansas State football rivalry is between the Kansas Jayhawks football team of the University of Kansas (KU) and Kansas State Wildcats football team of Kansas State University (KSU). The rivalry is officially named the Sunflower Showdown, with Dillons as the corporate sponsor. It has been played since 1902, making it one of the longest running college football rivalry games, with 120 match-ups as of 2022. In the entire history of the rivalry, the game has never been contested anywhere beside Manhattan or Lawrence, and alternates between the two respective campuses. Games in odd-numbered years are now played in Lawrence at The University of Kansas, and even-numbered years in Manhattan at Kansas State University.

KU leads the overall series 64–51–5, including its disputed forfeit of the 1980 game imposed by the Big Eight Conference. KSU leads the Governor's Cup series (since 1969) 33–20–1.

History

The two teams had a very long history prior to the inauguration of the Governor's Cup: they began play in 1902, with only a single interruption in 1910, and have now faced each other every season since 1911, making this the fifth-longest continuous series in college football history. The four longer active series are these: Lafayette-Lehigh (since 1897), Minnesota-Wisconsin (since 1906), Oklahoma-Oklahoma State (since 1910), and Wake Forest-North Carolina State (since 1910). It is the second-longest rivalry between two public universities in the same state featuring the names "University of _ vs. _ State University" (behind Oregon vs. Oregon State).

The two schools disagree on the overall series record, though both agree KU leads the series. The difference arises from the 1980 game, which KU won 20–18 on the field. However, the Big Eight Conference ordered KU to forfeit the game after a player was ruled ineligible. As a result, KU claims to lead the overall series 65–50–5, and KSU reports that KU leads 64–51–5. KU cites NCAA policy to explain its refusal to reckon the 1980 game as a KSU win; the policy states that NCAA schools must acknowledge forfeits imposed by the NCAA or those dictated by the rules of the game, without specifically referencing conference-imposed penalties.

The Governor's Cup is the third trophy associated with the rivalry. In 1902, in the first match-up, a "Governor's Trophy" was given to the winning team. Then, beginning in the 1940 football season, the winner of the KU-KSU contest received the "Peace Pact Trophy", which was miniature bronze goalposts. The trophy was intended to keep the winning team's student body from tearing down the loser's goalposts. These trophies were forgotten in time.

Series overview

Notable games

1910: The cancelled game
Kansas and Kansas State have played each other in football every year since 1902, except for 1910. The 1910 game was cancelled after the two teams were unable to agree to eligibility rules for the contest.  KU coach A. R. Kennedy tried to compel Kansas State to play the game by publishing provocative comments in the Lawrence newspaper in May 1910, but Kansas State coach Mike Ahearn refused to change his school's rules.

1927–1933: Road wins
For seven straight years, from 1927 to 1933, the two teams alternated wins, with the visiting team winning every game in contrast to the usual home field advantage in sports. In the six games from 1928 to 1933, every game was also won by shutout.

1969: First Governor's Cup game
Kansas State won the first contest in the Governor's Cup series 26–22 on October 11, 1969, in Lawrence, Kansas. The game was a classic in the series, contested by two high-quality teams. Kansas was coming off an appearance in the Orange Bowl the previous season, led by future Pro Football Hall of Fame running back John Riggins, while Kansas State in 1969 was an offensive juggernaut led by quarterback Lynn Dickey and running back Mack Herron. The game was not decided until the final play, when two K-State defenders jarred the ball loose from a KU receiver in the end zone. The loss sent KU's season into an irreversible tailspin, and the Jayhawks, suffering greatly from the loss of Bobby Douglass and John Zook to the NFL, finished the season 1–9, culminating with a 69-21 loss to Big Eight Conference champion Missouri at home.

Following the game, Kansas State fans tore down the goalposts in KU's stadium – an act with a long history in the rivalry, and that K-State fans would repeat in 1994 after ending an 11-game losing streak in Lawrence.

1980: The forfeit 
On November 1, 1980, Kansas defeated Kansas State 20–18 in Manhattan, Kansas to take a 9–3 lead in the first dozen years the Governor's Cup was awarded. However, it was later determined that Kerwin Bell, a running back for Kansas in that game, was a partial qualifier despite his high school transcripts indicating otherwise and he was ruled academically ineligible at the time of the 1980 season. In 1982 the Big Eight Conference ordered Kansas to forfeit three conference wins and one tie from the 1980 season, including its victory in the 1980 Governor's Cup game. As a result, the two schools now dispute the overall record in both the Sunflower Showdown and more recent Governor's Cup series, with each school claiming victory in the 1980 game.

1987: The Toilet Bowl 
The lone tie during the Governor's Cup era took place on November 7, 1987, in Manhattan, and is the most infamous game in the history of the series. Dubbed "The Toilet Bowl" and "The Futility Bowl" by national commentators, the game featured 1–7 KU and 0–8 K-State; the contest lived down to expectations and resulted in a 17–17 tie, which was secured when Kansas blocked a field goal as time expired. 

Following the tie, both teams lost their last two games of the season, with KU coach Bob Valesente being fired following the season. While his counterpart, Stan Parrish, kept his job, he was fired in 1988 after the Wildcats posted a 0–11 season to extend their winless streak to 28 games. Parrish's firing led to the hiring of Bill Snyder, who would shift the direction of the series in favor of the Wildcats.

1995: Two ranked teams 
The only match-up in history of the rivalry while both teams were ranked occurred on October 28, 1995, in Manhattan. The University of Kansas came into the game 7–0 and ranked #6 in the AP Poll, while Kansas State University was 5–1 and ranked #14. Both teams would finish the season ranked in the top ten, but this day belonged to Kansas State. KSU started strong and maintained the advantage throughout for a decisive 41–7 victory.

2002: 64–0 

Kansas State, 6–2 and ranked #14 in the AP Poll, routed Kansas in the largest margin of victory in the series by either team, 64–0, in Lawrence. The Wildcats built a 30–0 lead at the end of the 1st quarter and lead 43–0 at halftime. Wildcat quarterback Ell Roberson ran for 3 touchdowns and threw for another as the Wildcats outgained the Jayhawks 494–115. The Jayhawks also committed 7 turnovers in the loss. KSU went on to finish the season 11–2 and beat Arizona State in the Holiday Bowl, while the Jayhawks, under first year head coach Mark Mangino, finished the season at 2–10 and winless in conference play.

2004: Streak buster 
An 11-year winning streak by KSU that began in 1993 – at that time, the longest by either team in the series – was broken on October 9, 2004, when KU won a back-and-forth 31–28 thriller in Lawrence. The head coach of the Jayhawks was Mark Mangino, a former Wildcat assistant under KSU coach Bill Snyder.  Mangino bested his mentor in Snyder's final visit to Memorial Stadium during Snyder's first term as KSU coach.

2007: KU wins in Manhattan 
In 2007, KU won in Manhattan for the first time (and as of 2022, last) since 1989, and also posted its only victory over a ranked KSU team.  KU entered the game 4–0 while KSU had a 3–1 record, but KSU was favored in the contest and ranked 24th in the AP Poll.  Kansas overcame several mistakes through the course of the first half, tying the contest 14–14 at halftime.  Following a strong second-half performance by KU, the visitors from Lawrence posted a 30–24 victory.  KU went on to build an 11–0 record on the season before losing to Missouri, and secured an at-large bid to the 2008 Orange Bowl.

2010: A century straight 
For the 100th consecutive season, KU and KSU faced each other on the football field on October 14, 2010, in Lawrence. It was only the seventh college football rivalry in history played for a century straight. (Other series have subsequently reached the mark of 100 straight years or more). The game was the second since Bill Snyder returned to coach KSU and was reminiscent of earlier blowout Wildcat victories during Snyder's first tenure, with KSU claiming a 59–7 victory over KU. The 2010 victory by KSU was the second win in an active fourteen-game KSU winning streak over KU (the longest winning streak in series history).

Game results

See also
 List of NCAA college football rivalry games
 List of most-played college football series in NCAA Division I
 Aggieville riots

References

College football rivalries in the United States
Kansas Jayhawks football
Kansas State Wildcats football
1902 establishments in Kansas
Recurring sporting events established in 1902